Donald E. Biggs (born February 19, 1930) is an American former politician who served in the Kansas State Senate for one term from 1997 to 2000.

References

1930 births
Possibly living people
Democratic Party Kansas state senators
Politicians from Leavenworth, Kansas
20th-century American politicians